Kumba japonica is a species of rattail. It is found at depths of up to 710 m in the waters around Taiwan and southern Japan.

This fish reaches a length of up to 18 cm. Its main diagnostic features are its very short snout and three black spots at the base of the anal fin. Unlike many rattails and other deep-water fish, the bones of the head are firm.

References

A new species, Caelorinchus sheni, and 19 new records of grenadiers (Pisces: Gadiformes: Macrouridae) from Taiwan - CHIOU Mei-Luen ; SHAO Kwang-Tsao ; IWAMOTO Tomio

Macrouridae
Fish described in 1943
Taxa named by Kiyomatsu Matsubara